The Township of Emily was a municipality located in the south-eastern corner of the former Victoria County, now the city of Kawartha Lakes, in Ontario, Canada.

Emily Township is also home to Emily Provincial Park.

Communities 

Downeyville
Fee's Landing
Fowlers Corners
Omemee

Role in amalgamation 

Emily Township was responsible for requesting the commissioner who eventually ordered the amalgamation of the former County of Victoria municipalities.

See also
List of townships in Ontario

References 

Emily
Former township municipalities in Ontario